Bonilla de la Sierra is a municipality located in the province of Ávila, Castile and León, Spain. According to a 2006 census (INE), the municipality had a population of 152 inhabitants in 2006, making it one of the lowest populations in Spain.

References

Municipalities in the Province of Ávila